Diyala (transliterated from the Arabic ) may refer to:

 Diyala River
 Diyala Governorate
 Diyala FC

See also
 Diala, a genus of sea snails